Dolná Ves (before 1948(?): ,;) is a village and municipality in Žiar nad Hronom District in the Banská Bystrica Region of central Slovakia. It is near the town of Kremnica.

The first written record about the village is from the year 1427 (Schwabendorff), when the village became the property of Kremnica. Dolná Ves was part of Kremnica in the Middle Ages and from 1808 to 1882. The village was founded by German colonists.

Gallery

Genealogical resources

The records for genealogical research are available at the state archive "Statny Archiv in Banska Bystrica, Slovakia"

 Roman Catholic church records (births/marriages/deaths): 1674-1913 (parish B)
 Lutheran church records (births/marriages/deaths): 1666-1891 (parish B)

See also
 List of municipalities and towns in Slovakia

References

External links
https://web.archive.org/web/20080111223415/http://www.statistics.sk/mosmis/eng/run.html.  
http://www.e-obce.sk/obec/dolnaves/dolna-ves.html
Surnames of living people in Dolna Ves

Villages and municipalities in Žiar nad Hronom District